Edita is a female first name, a form of Edith. It may refer to:

Edita Abdieski (born 1984), Swiss singer
Edita Adlerová (born 1971), Czech opera singer
Edita Aradinović (born 1993), Serbian singer
Edita Brychta (born 1961), English actress
Edita Gruberová (1946–2021), Slovak opera singer
Edita Janeliūnaitė (born 1988), Lithuanian cyclist
Edita Morris (1902–1988), Swedish-American writer and political activist
Edita Piekha (born 1937), Soviet singer
Edita Pučinskaitė (born 1975), Lithuanian cyclist
Edita Raková (born 1978), Slovakian ice hockey player
Edita Šujanová (born 1985), Czech basketball player
Edita Tahiri (born 1956), Kosovar politician
Edita Vilkevičiūtė (born 1988), Lithuanian model

See also
 Edit (disambiguation)
 Edyta (disambiguation)

Lithuanian feminine given names